Eastlawn Gardens is a census-designated place (CDP) in Upper Nazareth Township in Northampton County, Pennsylvania. The population of Eastlawn Gardens was 3,307 at the 2010 census. Eastlawn Gardens is part of the Lehigh Valley metropolitan area, which had a population of 861,899 and was the 68th most populous metropolitan area in the U.S. as of the 2020 census.

Geography
Eastlawn Gardens is located at  (40.749065, -75.298750).

Demographics
As of the census of 2000, there were 2,832 people, 1,010 households, and 804 families residing in the CDP. The population density was 1,709.6 people per square mile (658.7/km2). There were 1,028 housing units at an average density of 620.6/sq mi (239.1/km2). The racial makeup of the CDP was 97.81% White, 0.28% African American, 0.18% Native American, 0.53% Asian, 0.74% from other races, and 0.46% from two or more races. Hispanic or Latino of any race were 1.41% of the population.

There were 1,010 households, out of which 42.9% had children under the age of 18 living with them, 69.2% were married couples living together, 8.0% had a female householder with no husband present, and 20.3% were non-families. 16.6% of all households were made up of individuals, and 9.0% had someone living alone who was 65 years of age or older. The average household size was 2.80 and the average family size was 3.17.

In Eastlawn Gardens, the population was spread out, with 28.9% under the age of 18, 4.7% from 18 to 24, 32.3% from 25 to 44, 20.0% from 45 to 64, and 14.2% who were 65 years of age or older. The median age was 37 years. For every 100 females, there were 97.6 males. For every 100 females age 18 and over, there were 93.1 males. The median income for a household in the CDP was $56,855, and the median income for a family was $62,969. Males had a median income of $43,688 versus $27,276 for females. The per capita income for the CDP was $23,985. About 0.8% of families and 1.9% of the population were below the poverty line, including 3.0% of those under age 18 and none of those age 65 or over.

Public education
The community is served by the Nazareth Area School District. Students in grades nine through 12 attend Nazareth Area High School in Nazareth.

References

Census-designated places in Northampton County, Pennsylvania
Census-designated places in Pennsylvania